Coatomer subunit beta is a protein that in humans is encoded by the COPB1 gene.

See also 
 COPI coatomer, a protein complex

References

Further reading

External links
 
 PDBe-KB provides an overview of all the structure information available in the PDB for Mouse Coatomer subunit beta